Fabius Township is a township in Davis County, Iowa, USA.  As of the 2000 census, its population was 169.

History
Fabius Township was organized in 1846. It is named from Fabius Creek.

Geography
Fabius Township covers an area of 35.85 square miles (92.85 square kilometers); of this, 0.02 square miles (0.05 square kilometers) or 0.05 percent is water.

Unincorporated towns
 Monterey
 Russellville (historical)
(This list is based on USGS data and may include former settlements.)

Adjacent townships
 West Grove Township (north)
 Wyacondah Township (east)
 Wells Township, Appanoose County (west)

Cemeteries
The township contains six cemeteries: Burgher, Hopkins, Horn, Johnson, Newton and Washington.

Major highways
 U.S. Route 63

References
 U.S. Board on Geographic Names (GNIS)
 United States Census Bureau cartographic boundary files

External links
 US-Counties.com
 City-Data.com

Townships in Davis County, Iowa
Townships in Iowa